Fosca may also refer to:

Literature and film
Fosca (novel), an 1869 novel by Iginio Ugo Tarchetti
Passion of Love, a 1981 Italian drama film directed by Ettore Scola adapted from Tarchetti's novel
Raimon Fosca, a man cursed to live forever All Men Are Mortal, a 1946 novel by Simone de Beauvoir

Music
Fosca (band), a British band active 1997 - 2009
Fosca (opera), an 1873 opera by Antônio Carlos Gomes based on Luigi Capranica's 1869 novel La festa delle Marie.
Fosca, character in Passion, based on the Tarchetti's novel

Geography
Fosca, Cundinamarca, a town in Colombia
Castell de la Fosca, an ancient Iberian settlement
La Fosca, a small village in the Mediterranean Costa Brava

See also 
 Santa Fosca (disambiguation)
 Uva Fosca